The Love We Make is a 2011 film.

The Love We Make may also refer to:
 "The Love We Make", a song by Prince from Emancipation (1996)
 "The Love We Make", a song by Girl Overboard